Ivan Brovkin on the State Farm is a 1959 Soviet comedy film directed by Ivan Lukinsky, sequel to the film Private Ivan. The film was a box-office success, it was seen by 44,6 million viewers in the USSR.

Plot
Ivan Brovkin completes military service with the rank of sergeant, and with a group of friends decides to go after demobilization to the developed virgin lands. He arrives to his native kolkhoz and is greeted by a cool reception: the collective farm chairman, bride Lyubasha and her mother regard him as traitor. The planned wedding is canceled and Brovkin leaves for the virgin land.

Brovkin comes to the virgin soil at the time of the plowing of the land. He joins the team. During everyday work winter passes. In letters home he writes that all is well. News of how Ivan lives spreads through the village. Lyubasha seriously thinks about how to escape from her home to the virgin lands.

In spring Brovkin is already appointed as foreman of the tractor brigade.

Harvest time is approaching. Brovkin considers to go back to his native farm because he misses his Lyubasha. Director of the farm knows this, and wishing to keep a valuable employee insistently recommends him to build a house. And then finally Brovkin's mother arrives to check up on him. Learning this the director instructs the driver to simulate breakdown of the engine on Brovkin's way from the airport to the farm, and he organizes a double-time construction of a house for the state farm foreman during a subbotnik.

Zahar Silich comes to the sovkhoz to pick up his bride Polina (who has also left for the virgin lands) home. But seeing the situation at the state farm he decides to stay on the virgin lands. Soon Zahar Silich has a wedding with his beloved.

Leader of production Ivan Brovkin is awarded with the Order of the Red Banner of Labour.

After the harvest, Zahar Silich with his wife and Ivan Brovkin come to visit their native village for a short time. Ivan marries his Lyubasha and together they go to the virgin lands.

Production
The picture was shot on virgin lands of the Orenburg Oblast in the sovkhoz "Komsomolskiy".

Cast
 Leonid Kharitonov
 Sergei Blinnikov
 Tatyana Pelttser
 Anna Kolomiytseva
 Vera Orlova
 Mikhail Pugovkin
 Vera Orlova as Polina Grebeshkova
 Konstantin Sinitsyn as Sergey Barabanov
 Tanat Zhailibekov as Mukhtar Abayev
 Sofya Zaykova as Dr. Irina Nikolayevna

References

External links

Soviet musical comedy films
1959 musical comedy films
1959 films
Gorky Film Studio films
Russian sequel films